The Third String is a 1932 British sports comedy film directed by George Pearson and starring Sandy Powell, Kay Hammond and Mark Daly. It is based on a W.W. Jacobs short story, which had previously been turned into a silent film. It was made at Cricklewood Studios.

Premise
A man poses as a boxer to impress a woman, but then is forced to fight a real champion.

Cast
 Sandy Powell as Ginger Dick  
 Kay Hammond as Hebe Tucker  
 Mark Daly as Pete Russett  
 Alf Goddard as Bill Lumm  
 Charles Paton as Sam Small  
 Sydney Fairbrother as Miss Peabody  
 Polly Emery as Mrs. Chip  
 James Knight as Webson

References

Bibliography
 Goble, Alan. The Complete Index to Literary Sources in Film. Walter de Gruyter, 1999.

External links
 

1932 films
1930s sports comedy films
1930s English-language films
British sports comedy films
Films shot at Cricklewood Studios
Films based on works by W. W. Jacobs
Films directed by George Pearson
British black-and-white films
Films based on short fiction
1932 comedy films
1930s British films